Hemmendorf is a suburban district of Rottenburg am Neckar in the administrative district of Tübingen in Baden-Württemberg (Germany).

Geography 

Hemmendorf is located about 9 km (5.6 mi) southern from Rottenburg am Neckar, on the Gäu-Plateau with an elevation from 405 to 528 m.

Extent 

The area of the district is 657 hectares. Thereof fall 54.8% upon agriculturally used area, 34.1% upon forest area, 9.7% upon settlement area and roads, 0.5 upon water expanse and 0.9% upon other.

Population 

Hemmendorf has 848 inhabitants (31/01/08). It is among the smaller districts of Rottenburg. At an area of 6.57 km² (2.5 sq mi) the population density represents 129 people per km², or 334 per sq mi.

Faiths 

Most of the population is predominantly Roman Catholic.

References

External links 
 Official Webpage (German)

Rottenburg am Neckar